Estelle Louise Fletcher (July 22, 1934 – September 23, 2022) was an American actress who portrayed the antagonist Nurse Ratched in One Flew Over the Cuckoo's Nest (1975), which earned her an Academy Award for Best Actress, a BAFTA Award, and a Golden Globe Award. She also had a recurring role as the Bajoran religious leader Kai Winn Adami in the television series Star Trek: Deep Space Nine (1993–99), as well as the role of Sebastian's aunt Helen Rosemond in the movie Cruel Intentions (1999). She was nominated for two Emmy Awards for her roles in the television series Picket Fences (1996) and Joan of Arcadia (2004). Her final role was as Rosie in the Netflix series Girlboss (2017).

Early life
Estelle Louise Fletcher was born on July 22, 1934, in Birmingham, Alabama, the second of four children of Estelle ( Caldwell) and the Reverend Robert Capers Fletcher, an Episcopalian missionary from Arab, Alabama. Both her parents were deaf and worked with the deaf and hard-of-hearing.

Fletcher's father founded more than 40 churches for the deaf in Alabama. Fletcher and her siblings, Roberta, John, and Georgianna, were all born without any hearing loss, so she was taught to speak by a hearing aunt. She received a bachelor's degree in drama from the University of North Carolina at Chapel Hill in 1957.

Career
Fletcher began appearing in several television series including Lawman (1958) and Maverick (1959). (The Maverick episode "The Saga of Waco Williams" with James Garner was the series's highest-rated episode.) Also in 1959, she appeared in an episode of the original Untouchables TV series starring Robert Stack, "Ma Barker and Her Boys", as Elouise. Fletcher recalled having greater success being cast in Westerns due to her height:

In 1960, Fletcher made two guest appearances on Perry Mason, as defendant Gladys Doyle in "The Case of the Mythical Monkeys", and as Susan Connolly in "The Case of the Larcenous Lady". In the summer of 1960, she was cast as Roberta McConnell in the episode "The Bounty Hunter" of Tate, starring David McLean.

In 1974, Fletcher returned to film in the crime drama Thieves Like Us, co-produced by her husband Jerry Bick and Robert Altman, who also directed. When the two had a falling out on Altman's next project (Nashville (1975)), Altman decided to cast Lily Tomlin for the role of Linnea Reese, initially created for and by Fletcher. Meanwhile, director Miloš Forman saw Fletcher in Thieves and cast her as McMurphy's nemesis Nurse Ratched in One Flew Over the Cuckoo's Nest (1975). She based her performance of the character on the paternalistic way she saw white people treat black people in her native Alabama. Fletcher gained international recognition and fame for the role, winning the Academy Award for Best Actress, as well as a BAFTA Award and Golden Globe. She was only the third actress ever to win an Academy Award, BAFTA Award, and Golden Globe Award for a single performance, after Audrey Hepburn and Liza Minnelli. When Fletcher accepted her Oscar, she used sign language to thank her parents.

After Cuckoo's Nest, Fletcher had mixed success in film. She made several financially and critically successful films, while others were box-office failures. Fletcher's film roles were in such features as Exorcist II: The Heretic (1977), The Cheap Detective (1978), The Lady in Red (1979), The Magician of Lublin (1979), Brainstorm (1983), Firestarter (1984), Invaders From Mars (1986), Flowers in the Attic (1987), Two Moon Junction (1988), Best of the Best (1989), Blue Steel (1990), Virtuosity (1995), High School High (1996), and Cruel Intentions (1999), as the aunt of Ryan Phillippe's Sebastian. Additionally, she played the character Ruth Shorter, a supporting role, in Aurora Borealis (2005), alongside Joshua Jackson and Donald Sutherland, and appeared in the Fox Faith film The Last Sin Eater (2007).

Fletcher co-starred in TV movies such as The Karen Carpenter Story (1989) (as Karen and Richard Carpenter's mother, Agnes), Nightmare on the 13th Floor (1990), The Haunting of Seacliff Inn (1994), and The Stepford Husbands (1996). From 1993 to 1999, she held a recurring role in Star Trek: Deep Space Nine as the scheming Bajoran religious leader Kai Winn Adami. She also earned Emmy Award nominations for her guest roles on Picket Fences (1996), and later on Joan of Arcadia (2004). In 2009, Fletcher appeared in Heroes as the physician mother of character Emma Coolidge. In 2011 and 2012, she appeared on four episodes of Shameless as Grammy Gallagher, Frank Gallagher's foul-mouthed and hard-living mother, who is serving a prison sentence for manslaughter related to a meth lab explosion. She portrayed the recurring role of Rosie on the series Girlboss (2017).

Personal life

Fletcher married producer Jerry Bick, divorcing in 1977. The couple had two sons, John Dashiell Bick and Andrew Wilson Bick. Fletcher took an 11-year break from acting to raise them.

Fletcher received an honorary degree from Gallaudet University in 1982.

Fletcher died at her home in Montdurausse, France, on September 23, 2022, at the age of 88.

Filmography

Film

Television

Accolades

References

External links

 
 
 
 
 

1934 births
2022 deaths
20th-century American actresses
21st-century American actresses
Actresses from Birmingham, Alabama
American film actresses
American television actresses
Best Actress Academy Award winners
Best Actress BAFTA Award winners
Best Drama Actress Golden Globe (film) winners
Ramsay High School alumni
People from Tarn (department)
University of North Carolina at Chapel Hill alumni
Western (genre) television actors
Episcopalians from Alabama
American expatriates in France